Fuego España F.C., also known as Fuego Espanya F.C., is a Filipino women's football club which played at the PFF Women's League, the top women's football league in the Philippines. Fuego España is the alumni football club of University of Santo Tomas.

Fuego España did not win a single match in its PFF Women's League participation history, with the club only scoring their first goal against University of Santo Tomas. The club only participated for the 2016–17 season of the PFF Women's League and did not enter the 2018 season.

2016 squad

Officials

References

Women's football clubs in the Philippines
PFF Women's League clubs
University of Santo Tomas